Ilium or Ileum may refer to:

Places and jurisdictions 
 Ilion (Asia Minor), former name of Troy
 Ilium (Epirus), an ancient city in Epirus, Greece
 Ilium, ancient name of Cestria (Epirus), an ancient city in Epirus, Greece
 Ilium Building, a building in Troy, New York, United States

Anatomy 
 Ilium (bone), part of the hip bone in the pelvis
 Ileum, the third and final part of the small intestine

Art and entertainment 
 Ileum (band), a grunge rock band from The Netherlands
 Ilium (band), a metal band from Australia
 Ilium (novel), a 2003 novel by Dan Simmons
 Ilium (Kurt Vonnegut), a fictional New York town in many of Kurt Vonnegut's novels
 Illium, a fictional location in the video game Mass Effect 2

Other uses 
 Camp Ilium, a YMCA camp

See also 
 Ilion (disambiguation)
 Ilum (disambiguation)
 Iliad (disambiguation)